The 2008 Odlum Brown Vancouver Open was a professional tennis tournament played on outdoor hard courts. It was the 4th edition, for men, and 7th edition, for women, of the tournament and part of the 2008 ATP Challenger Series and the 2008 ITF Women's Circuit, offering totals of $100,000, for men, and $50,000, for women, in prize money. It took place in West Vancouver, British Columbia, between July 28 and August 3, 2008.

Men's singles main-draw entrants

Seeds

1 Rankings are as of July 21, 2008

Other entrants
The following players received wildcards into the singles main draw:
 Philip Bester
 Michael McClune
 Nicholas Monroe
 Peter Polansky

The following player entered the singles main draw with a special exempt:
 Somdev Devvarman

The following players received entry from the qualifying draw:
 Ramón Delgado
 Im Kyu-tae
 Noam Okun
 Phillip Simmonds

The following player received entry as a lucky loser:
 Cecil Mamiit

Champions

Men's singles

 Dudi Sela def.  Kevin Kim, 6–3, 6–0

Women's singles

 Urszula Radwańska def.  Julie Coin, 2–6, 6–3, 7–5

Men's doubles

 Eric Butorac /  Travis Parrott def.  Rik de Voest /  Ashley Fisher, 6–4, 7–6(7–3)

Women's doubles

 Carly Gullickson /  Nicole Kriz def.  Christina Fusano /  Junri Namigata, 6–7(4–7), 6–1, [10–5]

External links
Official website

Odlum Brown Vancouver Open
Odlum Brown Vancouver Open
Vancouver Open
Odlum Brown Vancouver Open
Odlum Brown Vancouver Open
Odlum Brown Vancouver Open